The 2014 Townsville Football Cup was a friendly association football tournament played in the Townsville, Australia. It began on Sunday, 24 August 2014, and ended on Saturday, 30 August 2014. The participating teams were Sydney FC, Brisbane Roar, Newcastle Jets and Northern Fury. The Northern Fury team were unable to play their final fixture (due to having a National Premier Leagues Queensland match scheduled the next day in Brisbane) and were replaced by a composite North Queensland All Stars team.

Teams

Venue

Table

Matches

References

External links 
 Wingate Properties Townsville Football Cup Official Site

2014 in Australian soccer